Luzier is a surname. Notable people with the surname include:

 Ray Luzier (born 1970), American drummer
 Rénald Luzier alias Luz (born 1972), French satirical cartoonist